Artur Umamudinovich Sadirov (born 22 March 1985) is a Russian professional football coach and a former player.

Coaching career
On 28 October 2019 he was appointed caretaker manager of FC Anzhi Makhachkala following the dismissal of Valeri Barmin.

Personal life
His older brother Anzur Sadirov was also a professional footballer.

References

External links
 

1985 births
Living people
Russian footballers
Association football midfielders
FC Dynamo Stavropol players
FC Tyumen players
FC Anzhi Makhachkala players
FC Avangard Kursk players
Russian football managers
FC Anzhi Makhachkala managers
FC Mashuk-KMV Pyatigorsk players
FC Dynamo Makhachkala players
Sportspeople from Dagestan
20th-century Russian people
21st-century Russian people